Cimarron City is an American one-hour Western television series, starring George Montgomery as Matt Rockford and John Smith as Lane Temple, airing on NBC from October 11, 1958, to September 26, 1959. Cimarron City is a boomtown in Logan County, Oklahoma, north of Oklahoma City. Rich in oil and gold, Cimarron City aspires to become the capital of the future state of Oklahoma, to be created in 1907.

Synopsis

Matthew Rockford is the son of an area cattle rancher, who is the founder and mayor of Cimarron City. Lane Temple, the blacksmith, serves also as the deputy sheriff. He maintains the law amid the crooked schemes concocted in Cimarron City.

Audrey Totter played Beth Purcell, the owner of the boarding house. The episodes were supposed to rotate equally among Montgomery, Smith, and Totter. The writers, however, did not give Totter enough stories as promised, and she left the series.

Cimarron City also featured Dan Blocker (before Bonanza) in two roles. In the second episode, Blocker plays outlaw Carl Budinger, who is killed. In the fourth episode, he reappears as Carl's good-hearted brother, Tiny Budinger, who becomes one of Rockford's ranch hands.

Production notes
The series was filmed at the Iverson Movie Ranch in Chatsworth in Los Angeles County, California. The producers were Richard Bartlett and Norman Jolley.  Stanley Wilson wrote the theme music.

In its initial run, Cimarron City was placed opposite two half-hour Western programs on  CBS, Have Gun, Will Travel and Gunsmoke, from 9:30 to 10:30 p.m. Eastern Time on Saturdays. From June 1960 to September 1960, reruns were shown on Fridays from 7:30 to 8:30 p.m. Eastern Time, again on NBC.

Newspaper columnist Erskine Johnson wrote that NBC created Cimarron City expressly "to shoot it out with CBS TV's two guns — the half-hour Have Gun and the top-rated Gunsmoke, in most sections of the country." When the show's ratings failed to meet NBC executives' expectations, Smith's and Totter's roles grew in size and Montgomery "became a wanderer instead of a stay-at-home"; writers and directors were also changed. NBC spent additional money to bring in guest stars while sponsors were leaving the show, with several episodes having no sponsor.Toward the end of the series' original run, NBC found four rotating sponsors, some of whom limited their involvement to purchasing spot announcements.

Cast
 George Montgomery as Matt Rockford, Mayor and as narrator
 John Smith as Deputy Lane Temple
 Audrey Totter as Beth Purcell
 Dan Blocker as Tiny Carl Budinger
 Wally Brown as Jed Fame
 Claire Carleton as Alice Purdy
 Pete Dunn as Dody Hamer
 George Dunn as Jesse Williams
 Tom Fadden as Silas Perry
 Stuart Randall as Sheriff Art Sampson
 Addison Richards as Martin Kingsley
 Fred Sherman as Burt Purdy
 Nesdon Booth as Frank the bartender

Guest stars

 Nick Adams
 Morris Ankrum
 Frank Bank (uncredited)
 Edgar Buchanan
 John Carradine
 Walter Coy
 Linda Darnell
 Dan Duryea
 Olive Carey
 Spencer Chan
 Mike Connors
 Eduard Franz
 Robert Fuller
 Peter Graves
 Raymond Guth
 Myron Healey

 Ed Hinton
 Bern Hoffman
 Clyde Howdy
 Gary Hunley
 Richard Jaeckel
 Vivi Janiss
 Douglas Kennedy  
 Barbara Lawrence
 Norman Leavitt
 John Litel
 June Lockhart
 Fred MacMurray 
 Dorothy Malone
 Ken Mayer
 John McIntire
 Gary Merrill

 Elizabeth Montgomery
 Rita Moreno 
 J. Carrol Naish
 Debra Paget
 Gregg Palmer
 Luana Patten
 Larry Pennell
 Joe Ploski
 Jason Robards, Sr.
 Pernell Roberts
 Boyd Stockman
 Dean Stockwell
 Randy Stuart
 Gloria Talbott
 William Talman
 Lee Van Cleef

Episode list

Home media
On March 6, 2012, Timeless Media Group released Cimarron City: The Complete Series on DVD in Region 1.

References

External links

 http://www.westernclippings.com/remember/gmontgomery_doyouremember.shtml||Western Western Clippings George Montgomery interview

1958 American television series debuts
1959 American television series endings
Black-and-white American television shows
English-language television shows
NBC original programming
Television shows set in Oklahoma
1950s Western (genre) television series